Miķelis Lībietis (born 9 July 1992 in Sigulda) is a Latvian tennis player that competes on the ATP Challenger Tour and the ITF Men's Circuit. On 28 November 2016, he reached his highest ATP singles ranking of 352, and his highest doubles ranking of 172 was achieved on 6 November 2017. He has also been a regular member of the Latvian Davis Cup team since 2014.

He played NCAA college tennis at the University of Tennessee, graduating with a degree in Sociology – Criminal Justice in May 2015.

College career
Libietis arrived at Tennessee before the 2011–12 season and was one of four newcomers on the team, so he immediately found a role at the top of the lineup, a spot he has held for a majority of his All-American career.

As a sophomore in 2012–13, he earned the Intercollegiate Tennis Association national No. 1 ranking in singles and doubles with fellow sophomore Hunter Reese. He was the first Tennessee player in program history to hold both rankings simultaneously. He joined Andy Kohlberg, Paul Annacone, Chris Woodruff, John-Patrick Smith, and Rhyne Williams as Tennessee players to hold the No. 1 ranking.

In 2013–14, Libietis and Reese backed up their top national ranking by winning two major national titles. They won the ITA All-American Championships in October 2013. In May, they became the first Tennessee doubles team since 1980 to win the NCAA Doubles Championship, beating Ohio State's Peter Kobelt and Kevin Metka 7–6 (4), 6–7 (3), 7–6 (6).

During his final college season, Libietis and Reese became the first team to win back-to-back doubles titles at the ITA All-American Championships. They also won the 2014 Knoxville Challenger.

Tour titles

Doubles

References

External links
 
 

1992 births
Living people
Latvian male tennis players
People from Sigulda
People from Cēsis
Tennessee Volunteers men's tennis players